Goldener Adler is a traditional inn located in the historic center of Innsbruck city, Tyrol, Austria. 

Since its foundation in 1390, many drivers and merchants who were looking for rest and shelter on their journeys between Italy and Germany were welcome.

See also 
List of oldest companies

External links 
Homepage
Profile on Tirol.at

14th-century establishments in Austria
Companies based in Innsbruck
Companies established in the 14th century
Hotels in Austria
Restaurants in Austria